Andrei Nikolayevich Garbuzov (born 13 February 1984) is a former Russian professional football player.

Club career
He played two seasons in the Russian Football National League for FC Fakel Voronezh and FC Dynamo Saint Petersburg.

External links
 
 

1984 births
Sportspeople from Pskov
Living people
Russian footballers
Association football midfielders
FC Fakel Voronezh players
FC Volgar Astrakhan players
FC Dynamo Saint Petersburg players
FC Sever Murmansk players
FC Sheksna Cherepovets players